9 November has been the date of several important events in German history. The term Schicksalstag (German: Day of Fate) has been occasionally used by historians and journalists since shortly after World War II, but its current widespread use started with the events of 1989 when virtually all German media picked up the term.

Events
There are five notable events in German history that are connected to 9 November: the execution of Robert Blum in 1848, the end of the monarchies in 1918, the Hitler putsch attempt in 1923, the Nazi antisemitic pogroms in 1938 and the fall of the Berlin Wall in 1989.

 1848: After being arrested in the Vienna revolts, left-liberal leader Robert Blum was executed. The execution can be seen as a symbolic event or forecast of the ultimate crushing of the German March Revolution in April and May 1849.
 1918: During the November Revolution, Chancellor Max von Baden announced the abdication of Wilhelm II before the Emperor had in fact abdicated. Philipp Scheidemann proclaimed the German republic from a window of the Reichstag. Two hours later, Karl Liebknecht proclaimed a "Free Socialist Republic" from a balcony of the Berliner Stadtschloss. It was Scheidemann's intention to proclaim the republic before the communists did. Der 9. November (The Ninth of November) is the title of a novel by Bernhard Kellermann published in Germany that told the story of the German insurrection of 1918. 
 1923: The failed Beer Hall Putsch, from 8 to 9 November, marks an early emergence and provisional downfall of the Nazi Party as an important player on Germany's political landscape. Without sufficient preparation, Hitler simply declared himself leader in Munich, Bavaria. Hitler's march through Munich was stopped by Bavarian police who opened fire. Sixteen Nazis and four policemen were killed. Only after 1930 would Hitler gain significant voter support, a process that would culminate in the Nazis' electoral victory of 1933. During the Nazi rule 9 November was a national holiday in Germany in memory of the Nazis who died in the Beer Hall Putsch.
 1938: In what is today known as Kristallnacht (the Night of Broken Glass) or Reichspogromnacht, from 9 to 10 November, synagogues and Jewish property were burned and destroyed on a large scale, and more than four hundred Jews were killed or driven to commit suicide. The event demonstrated that the antisemitic stance of the Nazi regime was not so 'moderate' as it had partially appeared in earlier years. After 10 November, about 30,000 Jews were arrested; many of them later died in concentration camps.

 1989: The fall of the Berlin Wall ended the separation of Germany and started a series of events that ultimately led to German reunification. 9 November was originally considered to be the date for German Unity Day, but because it was also the anniversary of Kristallnacht, this date was considered inappropriate as a national holiday. The date of the formal reunification of Germany, 3 October 1990, was therefore chosen as the date for this German national holiday, and it replaced 17 June, the celebration of the uprising of 1953 in East Germany. East Germany opened checkpoints on this day which allowed people to go into West Germany.

Photography gallery

Notes

References
Deutsche Welle: Schicksalstag der Deutschen
Netzeitung: 9. November als "deutscher Schicksalstag"
Was ist Was: Schicksalstag
Stern "Schicksalstag der Deutschen": Gedenkstunden in Berlin

Further reading

External links

20th century in Germany
November
19th century in Germany